Challister is a crofting township and ward in northwestern Whalsay in the parish of Nesting in the Shetland islands of Scotland. Loch Vats-houll is in the vicinity. To the north is Challister Ness.

References

External links

Canmore - Whalsay, Oo Knowe site record

Villages in Whalsay